NBC 9 may refer to one of the following television stations in the United States:

Current
KCFW-TV, Kalispell, Montana
KRBC-TV, Abilene, Texas
KTSM-TV, El Paso, Texas
KUSA (TV), Denver, Colorado
KWES-TV, Midland/Odessa, Texas
WNBW-DT, Gainesville, Florida
WTOV-TV, Steubenville, Ohio/Wheeling, West Virginia
WTVA, Tupelo/Columbus, Mississippi

Former
KCEN-TV, Waco/Temple, Texas, on channel 9 from 2009 to 2010
KTRE, Lufkin/Nacogdoches, Texas, affiliated with NBC from 1955 to 1987
WROM-TV (now WTVC), Chattanooga, Tennessee, affiliated with NBC from 1953 to 1956
WSOC-TV, Charlotte, North Carolina, affiliated with NBC from 1957 to 1978